Thomas Wilfred Feeney (26 August 1910 – 5 March 1973), generally known as Tom Feeney but also as Wilf Feeney, was an English footballer who scored 36 goals from 130 appearances in the Football League playing as a centre forward or inside forward for Newcastle United, Notts County, Lincoln City, Stockport County, Halifax Town, Chester and Darlington in the 1930s. He began his career in non-league football with Grangetown St Mary's and Whitby United.

References

1910 births
1973 deaths
People from Grangetown, North Yorkshire
English footballers
Association football forwards
Whitby Town F.C. players
Newcastle United F.C. players
Notts County F.C. players
Lincoln City F.C. players
Stockport County F.C. players
Halifax Town A.F.C. players
Chester City F.C. players
Darlington F.C. players
English Football League players
Place of death missing